Ready Take One is a compilation album of previously unreleased Erroll Garner recordings. The album was released in 2016 by Legacy. The songs were pulled from sessions in 1967, 1969, and 1971. Ready Take One was given favorable reviews by numerous publications, including The Wall Street Journal.

Track listing 
 "High Wire" (Erroll Garner) - 3:47
 "I Want to Be Happy" (Irving Caesar, Otto Harbach, Vincent Youmans) - 3:00
 "I'm Confessin' (That I Love You)" (Doc Daugherty, Al J. Neiburg, Ellis Reynolds) - 5:02
 "Sunny" (Bobby Hebb) - 3:19
 "Wild Music" (Erroll Garner) - 5:06
 "Caravan" (Duke Ellington, Irving Mills, Juan Tizol) - 6:23
 "Back to You" (Erroll Garner) - 5:25
 "Night and Day (Cole Porter) - 4:25
 "Chase Me" (Erroll Garner) - 2:57
 "Satin Doll" (Duke Ellington, Johnny Mercer, Billy Strayhorn) - 5:51
 "Latin Digs" (Erroll Garner) - 5:27
 "Stella by Starlight" (Ned Washington, Victor Young) - 4:50
 "Down Wylie Avenue" (Erroll Garner) - 5:29
 "Misty" (Erroll Garner, Johnny Burke) - 4:52

References 

2016 compilation albums
Erroll Garner albums